Mornar is a South Slavic occupational surname literally meaning "mariner", "sailor". Notable people with the surname include:

Ivica Mornar
Marin Mornar
Matéo Mornar
Vedran Mornar

See also